Christian Dahle Borchgrevink (born 11 May 1999) is a Norwegian professional footballer who plays as right-back for Eliteserien club Vålerenga.

Career
Borchgrevink joined Vålerenga from Lille Tøyen at the age of 9 and signed his first professional contract with the club in March 2017.

Career statistics

References

External links
 Christian Borchgrevink at altomfotball.no
 Christian Borchgrevink at NFF

1999 births
Living people
Footballers from Oslo
Norwegian footballers
Norway youth international footballers
Norway under-21 international footballers
Association football defenders
Vålerenga Fotball players
Hamarkameratene players
Notodden FK players
Eliteserien players
Norwegian Second Division players
Norwegian First Division players